Margaret Davies (1884–1963) was a Welsh patron of the arts and an art collector

Margaret Davies may also refer to: 

 Margaret Llewelyn Davies (1861–1944), British women's rights campaigner
 Margaret Davies (writer) (c. 1700–1778 or 1785), Welsh poet
 Margaret M. Davies (born 1944), Australian herpetologist
 Margaret Davies (conservationist) (1914–1982), English conservationist and archaeologist

See also
 Davies (surname)